This is a list of ships that are named after the US State of Indiana.

Namesakes
Four ships of the United States Navy have been named USS Indiana in honor of the 19th state.
, was a battleship commissioned in 1895 that saw action in the Spanish–American War
, was a battleship under construction but canceled by the Washington Naval Treaty in 1924
, was a battleship commissioned in 1942 that saw action during World War II

Two ships have borne the name SS Indiana. They are:
 - a passenger steamship launched in 1873 by William Cramp & Sons for the American Line;
 - a passenger ship launched by Società Esercizio Bacini in 1905 for Lloyd Italiano.
 - a steamship built in 1848 by F.M. Keating.

Ships